Thyridachne is a genus of plants in the family Poaceae. The only known species is Thyridachne tisserantii, native to the Democratic Republic of the Congo and the Central African Republic.

References

Panicoideae
Grasses of Africa
Flora of the Central African Republic
Flora of the Democratic Republic of the Congo
Monotypic Poaceae genera